Aphantophryne pansa is a species of frog in the family Microhylidae. It is endemic to Papua New Guinea. Its natural habitat is subtropical or tropical high-altitude grassland.

References

pansa
Amphibians of Papua New Guinea
Taxonomy articles created by Polbot
Amphibians described in 1917